The extinct Messelirrisor is a genus of Bucerotiformes, the sole representative of the family Messelirrisoridae. They were tiny hoopoe-like birds that were the earliest representatives of the hoopoe/wood-hoopoe lineage, and they were among the predominant small forest birds of Central Europe during the Middle Eocene (some 49-37 mya). Fossilized remains of Messelirrisor have been found in the Messel Pit of Hesse, Germany.

Sources

External links
 Specimen photo. Retrieved 2007-AUG-22.

Coraciiformes
Eocene birds
Prehistoric birds of Europe
Fossil taxa described in 1998